Ibrahima Maïga (born 14 March 1979) is a Malian hurdler. He was born in Sareyamou.

He finished fourth at the 2004 African Championships, fifth at the 2006 African Championships and won the bronze medal at the 2008 African Championships. He also competed at the World Championships in 2005 and 2007 as well as the Olympic Games in 2004 and 2008 without reaching the final.

His personal best time is 49.13 seconds, achieved in April 2007 in Dakar.

External links

1979 births
Living people
Malian male hurdlers
Athletes (track and field) at the 2004 Summer Olympics
Athletes (track and field) at the 2008 Summer Olympics
Olympic athletes of Mali
People from Tombouctou Region
21st-century Malian people